Massimo Iosa Ghini (born 18 June 1959) is an Italian architect, designer and professor known for pioneering the Bolidist Movement, and for his involvement with the Memphis Group featuring others architects including Ettore Sottsass, Michael Graves. Iosa Ghini is known for his streamlined and organic designs, and is praised for his “visionary ability to blend disciplines, forms and dimensions crossing boundaries in art, design, and architecture.”
He has worked prolifically throughout the world and has designed a large collection of furniture that mirrors the futuristic designs of his architectural work. In 1990 he started the Iosa Ghini Associati (Associates) Firm which today operates out of Milan, Bologna, Moscow and Miami.

Schooling
Born in Bologna, Massimo Iosa Ghini was set on pursuing illustration until he realized his passion for architecture. He attended Milan Polytechnic, upon graduating he was thrust into the fast-paced 1980s, a period which greatly inspired his work, in which he plays with the ideas of media and movement.  He went onto pursuing a variety of artistic practices in this period including furniture design, and set design for an Italian TV network.  In 1981, his eccentric designs landed him in the midst of the Memphis Group. This cutting edge forum of architecture and design served as a kind of further schooling for the young architect. It was here that he completed several iconic works including the "Bertrand" Sideboard and the "Otello" armchair, one of which was recently auctioned off in the late David Bowie's Collection.

He previously taught at the Sapienza University in Rome, was an adjunct professor at the Hong Kong Technical University and currently teaches at Ferrara University.

Bolidism
Iosa Ghini is considered one of the Fathers of Bolidism, a style which he sums up as “ a way of narrating the transition from materialety to drawing things in which the visual and media aspect prevails with respect to the object’s functional purpose”(40). It can be described as a colorful style founded in the 1980s that borrows elements from futurism, and is fascinated with human and machine interaction.

Architecture

In the year 1990, Massimo founded Iosa Ghini Associati with his Wife Milena Mussi. His Firm has since worked with many International groups, developing large-scale residential, commercial and public spaces. One of his notable projects is at the Ferrari Factory Store, in which his dynamic, futurist and strikingly Italian style is transparent. His office focuses largely on the modern human experience in their architectural work, in particular how media and communication and transportation are all present in design. Massimo Iosa Ghini's colorful touch always brings a vibrancy to his work, giving a playfulness to his projects. Aside from the companies before mentioned he has helped in worldwide development of the brands such as IBM, Kiko Milano, the Capital Group, Alitalia, among many others.  
Iosa Ghini work has been celebrated and he was selected by Luca Zevi, curator of the Italian Pavilion at Venice Architecture Biennale 2012, for the exhibition “Architetture del Made in Italy” with the project “Seat Pagine Gialle” (Turin).

Product Design

Several of Iosa Ghini's products were featured in the historic Memphis Project. His style is very much in the spirit of that exhibition which rejected rationalism and celebrated decoration. Iosa Ghini's design is very playful and retains this unique feature on all scales. He has over the years designed everything from tableware to furniture to public transportation and has collaborated with product brands such as Alessi, and Duravit. Many projects designed by him on all scales are part of various museum collections and have received acknowledgements and mentions, including with the Good Design Award of the Chicago Athenaeum and the Roscoe Award, the IAI Green Design Award (China), the if Product Design Award and the Red Dot Award. Iosa Ghini continues to place great importance on the design of furniture in his Commissions, giving all his works a unique bespoke quality. Massimo's furniture creates coherency in his work and helps bring his colorful visions to life.

Work

The following projects are listed on the Iosa Ghini website, below are a selection of notable realized works:
 
BRICKELL FLATIRON, MIAMI (USA) UNDER CONSTRUCTION
MARCONI EXPRESS, PEOPLE MOVER, BOLOGNA (ITALIA) 
OKO RESIDENTIAL BUILDING, MOSCA (RUSSIA) 2016
“LINEA DI LUCE" (ITALIA) 2014
IBM ITALIA, IBM SOFTWARE EXECUTIVE BRIEFING CENTER, ROMA (ITALIA) 2010
GARAGE SAN MARCO, VENEZIA (ITALIA) 2009
FERRARI FACTORY STORE, SERRAVALLE SCRIVIA (ITALIA) 2009
FERRARI, GALLERIA MUSEO FERRARI, MARANELLO (ITALIA) 2004
BOSCOLO GROUP, NEW YORK RESIDENCE, BUDAPEST (UNGHERIA) 2004
KIKO MAKE UP MILANO, STORES DAL 2006
SUPERGA, STORES 1997

Bibliography
 Massimo Iosa Ghini, Sillavengo, Edition Rossi Schreiber, 1991
 Massimo Iosa Ghini Disegni, Kalòs, 1992
 Massimo Iosa Ghini, N.N. Edizioni, Düsseldorf, 1993 
 La Stazione della metropolitana Kroepke a Hannover, Electa, Milano 2000
 15 anni di progetti, Electa, Milano 2001
 Car Corporate Image, Electa, Milano 2002
 Design del Negozio - lo Spazio Esperienziale, 2002
 Esercizi di architettura - Involucri – Exercises in architecture, Electa, Milano 2003
 Massimo Iosa Ghini da designer ad architetto, Editrice Compositori, Bologna 2005
 Massimo Iosa Ghini, Disegni di architetture, Antonia Jannone Galleria 2007
 Sostenibile Ma Bello. Progetti di Iosa Ghini Associati Editrice Compositori, Bologna 2009
 Design del XX secolo, Charlotte & Peter Fiell, Taschen, 2011
 Agora / Form and Technology / IBM Software Executive Briefing Center – Rome, Electa, Milano 2012 
 I protagonisti del design – Massimo Iosa Ghini, Vol. 33, Hachette Fascicoli, Milano 2012 
 Massimo Iosa Ghini, Skira Editore, Milano 2013

References

Living people
1959 births
Architects from Bologna